Athol Shephard (16 August 1920 – 2 February 2006) was an Australian cricketer. He played seven first-class matches for Tasmania between 1948 and 1960.

See also
 List of Tasmanian representative cricketers

References

External links
 

1920 births
2006 deaths
Australian cricketers
Tasmania cricketers
Cricketers from Tasmania
People from Burnie, Tasmania